ATPase ASNA1 also known as arsenical pump-driving ATPase and arsenite-stimulated ATPase is an enzyme that in humans is encoded by the ASNA1 gene.

Function 

ASNA1 is the human homolog of the bacterial arsA gene. In E. coli, arsA ATPase is the catalytic component of a multisubunit oxyanion pump that is responsible for resistance to arsenicals and antimonials.

Interactions

ASNA1 is found to interact with FAM71D according to STRING

References

External links

Further reading